Katla (stylized as KATLA) is an Icelandic mystery-drama television series created by Baltasar Kormákur and Sigurjón Kjartansson. The show premiered on 17 June 2021 on Netflix.

Synopsis
A year after an eruption of the Katla volcano began, only a few people remain in the nearby town of Vík, persisting despite choking ash. An ash-caked woman who apparently disappeared twenty years earlier appears in the village, looking as she did back then. More ash-caked people who died in the past arrive in Vík, creating a paradox for those who knew them and reviving legends of "changelings". Meanwhile, a volcanologist from Reykjavík discovers the remains of a meteorite buried in the glacier, while having to deal emotionally with the reappearance of his dead son. Through their interactions with the "changelings", the inhabitants of Vík are forced to find their own ways of dealing with their unresolved issues from the past.

Cast and characters
 Guðrún Eyfjörð as Gríma Þórsdóttir, younger sister of Ása
 Íris Tanja Flygenring as Ása Þórsdóttir, Gríma's older sister, who died a year ago.
 Ingvar Sigurðsson as Þór (Thor), father of Gríma, Ása, and Björn
 Aliette Opheim as Gunhild in the present and as a young woman; mother of Björn
 Valter Skarsgård as Björn, son of Gunhild and Þór through an affair twenty years earlier
 Aldís Amah Hamilton as Eyja
 Þorsteinn Bachmann as Gísli, head of the local police, husband of Magnea
 Sólveig Arnarsdóttir as Magnea in the present and as a young woman; wife of Gísli
 Haraldur Ari Stefánsson as Einar, son of Gísli and Magnea
 Björn Thors as Darri, vulcanologist; husband of Rakel and father of Mikael
 Birgitta Birgisdóttir as Rakel, wife of Darri and mother of Mikael
 Hlynur Atli Harðarson as Mikael, son of Darri and Rakel who died in an accident years ago.
 Helga Braga Jónsdóttir as Vigdís
 Björn Ingi Hilmarsson as Leifur

Episodes

Production
In February 2017, Variety magazine reported that Baltasar Kormákur would be working on Katla, a supernatural drama series centered on the volcano of the same name, with filming to take place outside Reykjavík. In October 2019, it was reported that RVK Studios was developing the series for Netflix, to be directed by Kormákur and Sigurjón Kjartansson. The series started production prior to the COVID-19 pandemic, and the subsequent forced shutdown put a halt to the work, which had covered a few weeks by that point. Kormákur resumed production in April 2020.

Critical reception

John Doyle of The Globe and Mail wrote: "In what is a slow-moving, Stygian and enigmatic eight-part series ... there's a beguiling mystery about heartbreak." Robyn Chowdhury of New Scientist praised the series in her review, concluding: "Katla is a thriller with such depth that some episodes, particularly the fast-paced season finale, can leave you feeling genuinely emotionally raw. It is a story about grief with unpredictably dark twists and turns, worthy of multiple watches."

See also
 The Returned, French TV series
 Glitch, Australian TV series

References

External links
 
 
 

2020s Icelandic television series
2021 television series debuts
Disaster television series
Icelandic-language television shows
Katla (volcano)
Mystery television series
Netflix original programming
Television shows set in Iceland
Works about volcanoes